Sadovoye is a rural locality (a selo) in Pravovostochny Selsoviet of Ivanovsky District, Amur Oblast, Russia. The population was 98 as of 2018. There are 2 streets.

Geography 
Sadovoye is located on the right bank of the Manchzhurka River, 14 km east of Ivanovka (the district's administrative centre) by road. Pravovostochnoye is the nearest rural locality.

References 

Rural localities in Ivanovsky District, Amur Oblast